Alasdair Fotheringham is a British foreign affairs and sports journalist, specializing in cycle racing. 

Based in Spain, Fotheringham works as a freelance journalist and has been the Independent'''s cycling correspondent since 2001.  
He has also written articles for The Independent On Sunday, The Guardian, The Daily Express, The Sunday Express, Cycling Weekly'' and Reuters. 

Having covered the Tour de France 17 times, Fotheringham covered the Olympic Games for the first time in 2008. He is the brother of fellow cycling journalist William Fotheringham.

Books

References

Cycling journalists
Cycling writers
British male journalists
Living people
Place of birth missing (living people)
Year of birth missing (living people)